Human sexuality covers a broad range of topics, including the physiological, psychological, social, cultural, political, philosophical, ethical, moral, theological, legal and spiritual or religious aspects of sex and human sexual behavior.

Articles pertaining to human sexuality include:

!$@
-phil-
$pread

A
A Mind of Its Own: A Cultural History of the Penis
A Return to Love
Abasiophilia
Abortion
Abstinence
Abstinence-only sex education
Abstinence, be faithful, use a condom
Accidental incest
Acrosome
Acrosome reaction
Acrotomophilia
Activin and inhibin
Adolescent sexuality
Adolescent sexuality in the United States
Adult Check
Adult Industry Medical Health Care Foundation
Adult Verification System
Adult video arcade
Adult video game
Adultery
Advanced maternal age
Aedeagus
Affair
Affection
Affectional bond
Affectional orientation
African-American culture and sexual orientation
Agalmatophilia
Agapism
Age at first marriage
Age disparity in sexual relationships
Age of consent
Age of consent reform
Ageplay
Ages of consent in Africa
Ages of consent in Asia
Ages of consent in Europe
Ages of consent in North America
Ages of consent in Oceania
Ages of consent in South America
AIDS
AIDS in the pornographic film industry
Alan Soble
Albanian sworn virgins
Alcohol and sex
All About Love: New Visions
Allantois
Alt porn
Alt.sex
Alt.sex.stories
American Association of Sexuality Educators, Counselors and Therapists
American Birth Control League
American Fertility Association
American Institute of Bisexuality
American Journal of Sexuality Education
Anal beads
Anal masturbation
Anal sex
Anaphrodisiac
Anarchism and issues related to love and sex
Anatomically correct doll
Ancient Greek eros
Andrology
Androphilia and gynephilia
Anilingus
Animal roleplay
Animal sexual behaviour
Anovulatory cycle
Anthropophilia in animals
Anti-pornography movement
Antisexualism
Aphanisis
Aphrodisiac
Apotemnophilia
Aquaphilia (fetish)
Armpit fetishism
Arse Elektronika
Artificial hymen
Asexuality
Asherman's syndrome
Ass to mouth
Assortative mating
Astroglide
Athenian pederasty
AtomAge
Attachment in adults
Attachment in children
Attachment measures
Attachment theory
Attraction to disability
Attraction to transgender people
Autagonistophilia
Autassassinophilia
Autoerotic fatality
Autoeroticism
Autosadism

B
Baby boom
Balloon fetish
Banjee
Bare Behind Bars
Bareback (sexual act)
Barley-Break
Baseball metaphors for sex
BDSM
BDSM and the law
BDSM in culture and media
Beate Uhse-Rotermund
Beate Uhse Erotic Museum
Beginning of pregnancy controversy
Benandanti
Bend Over Boyfriend
Benjamin scale
Berl Kutchinsky
Beyaz (drug)
Biastophilia
Biblical courtship
Bidder's organ
Biology and sexual orientation
Birth control
Birth Control (film)
Birth Control Council of America
Birth control movement in the United States
Birth control sabotage
Birth dearth
Birth rate
Bisexual pornography
Bisexual pride flag
Bisexuality
Blanchard's transsexualism typology
Blood–testis barrier
Blood fetishism
Blue balls
Bluedating
Blunder Broad
Bob Champion
Body inflation
Body odor and subconscious human sexual attraction
Boink
Bokanovsky's process
Bonk: The Curious Coupling of Science and Sex
Boot fetishism
Born-again virgin
Boston Corbett
Boston Medical Group
Bottletop
Boyfriend
Bracha L. Ettinger
Breast binding
Breast fetishism
British Journal of Sexual Medicine
British Society for the Study of Sex Psychology
Broken heart
Brotherly love (philosophy)
Buddhism and sexual orientation
Buddhism and sexuality
Bugchasing
Bukkake (sexual practice)
Bundling (tradition)
Bunga bunga
Burusera
Buttocks eroticism

C
Camel toe
Camgirl
Candaulism
Capacitation
Carrageenan
Cass identity model
Casting couch
Castration
Casual relationship
Casual sex
Catfight
Catholic sex abuse cases
Catholicism and sexuality
Celibacy
Certified Sex Therapist
Chickenhawk (gay slang)
Chickenhead (sexuality)
Child-on-child sexual abuse
Child sex
Child sex tourism
Child sexual abuse
Child sexuality
Childbirth
Choice USA
Chremastistophilia
Christian side hug
Christianity and sexual orientation
Chronophilia
Cicisbeo
Circle jerk (sexual practice)
Circumcision
Clinical vampirism
Clitoris
Clitorism
Clothing fetish
Club wear
Clubwear
Co-sleeping
Cock ring
Cock and ball torture
Cockle bread
Coitus reservatus
Compassionate love
Compersion
Compulsory sterilization
Concept Foundation
Concubinage
Condom
Condom fatigue
Condoms, needles, and negotiation
Conjugal love
Conjugal visit
Conscience clause (medical)
Consecrated virgin
Constitutional growth delay
Contraception
Contraception in the Republic of Ireland
Contraceptive security
Coolidge effect
Coprophilia
Corrective rape
Cortical reaction
Couple costume
Courtly love
Courtship
Courtship disorder
Covert incest
Crab louse
Creampie
Creampie (sexual act)
Cretan pederasty
Crime of passion
Criminal transmission of HIV
Cross dressing
Cruising for sex
Crush fetish
Crystallization (love)
Cuban National Center for Sex Education
Cuckold
Cuddle party
Cum shot
Cunnilingus
Cunt
Cupboard love
Curial response to Catholic sex abuse cases
Cutty-sark (witch)
Cyber sex
Cybersex
Cytoplasmic incompatibility
Cytoplasmic transfer

D
Dacryphilia
Damsel in distress
Dartos
Date rape
Davian behavior
David Reimer
Day of Conception
De amore (Andreas Capellanus)
Dear John letter
Debagging
Decrement table
Deep-throating
Delayed ejaculation
Delayed puberty
Demographics of sexual orientation
Dendrophilia (paraphilia)
Dental dam
Desire (emotion)
Desire discrepancy
Deus caritas est
Dhat syndrome
Dildo
Diotima of Mantinea
Dippoldism
Dirty Sanchez (sexual act)
Dirty talk
Discipline (BDSM)
Document 12-571-3570
Dogging (sexual slang)
Doll fetish
Domination and submission
Dominatrix
Domnei
"Don't Stand So Close to Me"
Don Juan
Donkey punch
DontDateHimGirl.com
Douche
Downblouse
Droit du seigneur
Dry enema
Dry sex
Dual protection
Dutch Society for Sexual Reform
Dydd Santes Dwynwen
Dyspareunia

E
Easterlin hypothesis
Ecclesiastical response to Catholic sex abuse cases
Écriture féminine
Edging (sexual practice)
Education for Citizenship (Spain)
Effects of pornography
Effeminacy
Egg (biology)
Eggshell
Ego-dystonic sexual orientation
Ejaculation
Eli Coleman
Élisabeth Badinter
Emasculation
Embryo transfer
Emergency contraceptive availability by country
Emetophilia
Emotion in animals
Emotional affair
Emotional intimacy
Encyclopedia of Pleasure
Endocrinology
Enema
Enjo kōsai
Environment and sexual orientation
Enzyte
Ephebophilia
Erectile dysfunction
Erection
Erogenous zone
Eros (concept)
Erotic
Erotic Awards
Erotic electrostimulation
Erotic fantasy
Erotic humiliation
Erotic hypnosis
Erotic lactation
Erotic literature
Erotic massage
Erotic sexual denial
Erotic spanking
Erotica
Eroticism
Eroto-comatose lucidity
Erotolepsy
Erotomania
Erotophilia
Erotophobia
Erotosexual
Eskimo kissing
Estrogen
Ethnic pornography
Eve Kosofsky Sedgwick
Evolutionary psychology
Ex-gay movement
Exhibitionism
Exoletus
ExtenZe

F
Facesitting
Facial
Falling in love
Fallopian Tubes
Family planning
Family planning in India
Family planning in Iran
Family planning in Pakistan
Fans of X-Rated Entertainment
Fat fetishism
Fear of commitment
Fecundity
Felching
Fellatio
Female copulatory vocalization
Female ejaculation
Female genital cutting
Female hysteria
Female infertility
Female sex tourism
Female sexual arousal disorder
Female sexuality
Female sperm storage
Feminine essence concept of transsexuality
Feminism
Feminist sex wars
Feminist sexology
Feminist views of pornography
Feminist views on BDSM
Feminization (activity)
Fertilisation
Fertility
Fertility-development controversy
Fertility and intelligence
Fertility rite
Fertility symbol
Fetish magazine
Fetish model
Fetus
Fingering (sexual act)
Fisting
Fixation (psychology)
Fleshlight
Flirting
Flogging
Flower
Follicular phase
Food and sexuality
Food play
Foot fetishism
Footjob
Forced orgasm
Foreplay
Foreskin
Foreskin restoration
Formicophilia
Fornication
Foxy boxing
Frank Harris
Fraternal birth order and male sexual orientation
Free love
Free Speech Coalition
Free union
French kiss
Friend zone
Frot
Frotteurism
Fuck
Fuck for Forest
Fur massage

G
Gametangium
Gamete
Gametogenesis
Gang bang
Gang bang pornography
Gang rape
Gangbang
Gay
Gay bomb
Gay Kids
Geeta Nargund
Gender
Gender and crime
Gender apartheid
Gender identity
Gender identity disorder
Gender identity disorder in children
Gender paradigm
Gender segregation and Islam
Genetic sexual attraction
Genital corpuscles
Genital modification and mutilation
Genital play
Genital wart
Genitourinary medicine
Genophobia
George Santayana
Georges Bataille
Geriatric sexology
German Society for Social-Scientific Sexuality Research
Gerontophilia
Gestation period
Giles' theory of sexual desire
Girlfriend
Girlfriend experience
Glans
Gloria E. Anzaldúa
Glory hole
Glove fetishism
Gofraid Donn
Golden Age of Porn
Gonadarche
Gonadotropin
Gonadotropin preparations
Gonocyte
Gonorrhea
Gratification disorder
Graydancer's Ropecast
Greek love
Greek words for love
Griselda Pollock
Groping
Gross reproduction rate
Grotesque body
Group sex
Groupie
Growing Up (1971 film)
Guy Hocquenghem
Gynaecology
Gynoecium
Gynophobia

H
Habitual abortion
Hair fetishism
Haitian Vodou and sexual orientation
Hand fetishism
Handedness and sexual orientation
Handjob
Hare Krishna movement and sexual orientation
Harem effect
Harmful to Minors
Harry Crookshank
Hatred
Head shaving
Heather Corinna
Heavy petting
Hebephilia
Heihaizi
Hélène Cixous
Hepatitis
Herpes simplex virus
Herpes support groups
Heteroflexible
Heterophile
Heterosexual–homosexual continuum
Heterosexuality
Hey Nineteen
Hickey
Hierophilia
Hijra (South Asia)
Hirsutophilia
History of attachment theory
History of erotic depictions
History of evolutionary psychology
History of homosexuality
History of human sexuality
History of masturbation
History of narcissism
History of prostitution
History of sex in India
HIV
Hogging (sexual practice)
Homophobia
Homosexuality
Homosexuality and psychology
Hostile work environment
Hot or Not
House party
How to Have Sex in an Epidemic: One Approach
Hug
Hugs and kisses
Human bonding
Human female sexuality
Human fertilization
Human gonad
Human male sexuality
Human population control
Human sexual activity
Human sexual behavior
Human sexual response cycle
Human sexuality
Human sterilization (surgical procedure)
Hybristophilia
Hydatid of Morgagni
Hydrocele testis
Hyperactivation
Hypergamy
Hypergonadism
Hypersexual disorder
Hypersexuality
Hypoactive sexual desire disorder
Hypogonadism
Hyposexuality

I
I'll show you mine if you show me yours
Ideal Marriage: Its Physiology and Technique
Identity (social science)
Imagery of nude celebrities
Immanuel Kant
Impact play
Implantation (human embryo)
Imprinting (psychology)
In Praise of the Stepmother
In vitro fertilisation
Incest
Incest in popular culture
Income and fertility
Indecent exposure
Index of BDSM articles
Infertility
Infidelity
Inis Beag
Insemination
Inside Deep Throat
Institut für Sexualwissenschaft
Institute for Advanced Study of Human Sexuality
Instruction and Advice for the Young Bride
Intercrural sex
Interferon tau
International Academy of Sex Research
International Fetish Day
International Mr. Leather
Internet addiction disorder
Internet pornography
Internet relationship
Interpersonal attraction
Interracial personals
Intersex
Intersex flag
Intersex human rights
Intimate relationship
Irrumatio
Is the School House the Proper Place to Teach Raw Sex?
Ishq
Islam and sexual orientation
Islamic sexual jurisprudence
It's Perfectly Normal
It's So Amazing
It girl

J
Jacques Hassoun
Jacques Lacan
Jailbait
Jealousy
Jewish views on love
Jewish views on marriage
John D'Emilio
John Sutcliffe (designer)
John William Lloyd
Jolan Chang
Jonathan David Katz
Josephine Mutzenbacher
Jouissance
Judaism and sexual orientation
Judith Butler
Julia Kristeva

K
K-Y Jelly
Kagema
Kama sutra
Kanashimi no Belladonna
Kegel exercise
Kegel exercisers
Ken Marcus
Khosrow and Shirin
Kidding Aside
KinK
Kinky sex
Kinsey Institute for Research in Sex, Gender, and Reproduction
Kinsey scale
Kiss
Kiss chase
Kissing traditions
Kizzy: Mum at 14
Klein Sexual Orientation Grid
Klismaphilia
Koro (medicine)
Kukeri

L
L word
Lack (manque)
Lactation
Lafayette Morehouse
Laskey, Jaggard and Brown v United Kingdom
Latent homosexuality
Latex and PVC fetishism
Latex clothing
Layla and Majnun
Leather fetishism
Leather Pride flag
Leather subculture
Legal objections to pornography in the United States
Legal recognition of intersex people
Lesbian
Lesbian sexual practices
Lesbianism
Leydig cell
LGBT
LGBT sex education
LGBT themes in speculative fiction
LGBTI Health Summit
Li Yannian (musician)
Libertine
Libido
Life partner
Limbic resonance
Limbic revision
Limerence
Lingerie
List of anarchist pornographic projects and models
List of BDSM equipment
List of BDSM organizations
List of bondage positions
List of fertility deities
List of films that most frequently use the word "fuck"
List of hentai authors
List of homologues of the human reproductive system
List of PAN dating software
List of paraphilias
List of pornographic book publishers
List of pornographic magazines
List of prostitutes and courtesans
List of sex positions
List of sexology journals
List of sexology organizations
List of sexual slang
List of sovereign states and dependent territories by fertility rate
List of topics on sexual ethics
List of youngest birth mothers
Living and Growing
Living apart together
Lolita
London amora
Long-acting reversible contraceptive
Lookism
Lost Girls (graphic novel)
Lotion play
Love
Love-in
Love–hate relationship
Love & Respect
Love (sculpture)
Love addiction
Love at first sight
Love dart
Love Is...
Love letter
Love magic
Love of Christ
Love of God
Love of God in Christianity
Love padlocks
Love styles
Love triangle
Lovegety
Lovemap
Lovesickness
Lovestruck
Loyalty
Luce Irigaray
Lust
Lust murder

M
Macrophilia
Magnus Hirschfeld Medal
Making out
Making sense of abstinence
Male accessory gland
Male infertility
Male prostitute
Mama-san
Mammary intercourse
Mandarin Chinese profanity
Marital rape
Marquis de Sade
Marriage
Marriage and Morals
Marriageable age
Married Love
Masters and Johnson
Masters and Johnson Institute
Masturbate-a-thon
Masturbation
Mat (Russian profanity)
Maternal bond
Maternal health
Mating
Mating system
Mechanics of human sexuality
Mechanics of sex
Mechanophilia
Media coverage of Catholic sexual abuse cases
Medical abortion
Medical fetishism
Meet market
Megaspore
Men who have sex with men
Ménage à trois
Menarche
Menstruation
Meretrix
Methyl cellulose
Mettā
Michael Uebel
Michel Foucault
Mighty Jill Off
Mile high club
Miley Jab Hum Tum
MILF Island
MILF pornography
Minors and abortion
Mirror stage
Misattribution of arousal
Misogyny
Mister Leather Europe
Mistress (lover)
Modern primitive
Monique Wittig
Monocarpic
Monogamy
Monosexuality
Mosley v News Group Newspapers
Mosley v United Kingdom
Muscle worship
My Mom's Having a Baby
Mysophilia

N
Naked Ambition: An R Rated Look at an X Rated Industry
Naked Science
Naked Women's Wrestling League
Name of the Father
Nanpa
Narcissistic parents
Narratophilia
National Birth Control League
National Gamete Donation Trust
National Longitudinal Study of Adolescent Health
National Sexuality Resource Center
National Survey of Sexual Health and Behavior
Natural fertility
Navel fetishism
Necrophilia
Necrophilia in popular culture
Neotantra
Net reproduction rate
Neuroscience and sexual orientation
New relationship energy
Nice guy
Nidamental gland
Nightwork: Sexuality, Pleasure, and Corporate Masculinity in a Tokyo Hostess Club
Nin-imma
Nipple clamp
No Kidding!
No Secrets (Adult Protection)
Non-heterosexual
Non-penetrative sex
Nookie
North American Man/Boy Love Association
Nose fetishism
Nubile
Nyotaimori

O
Object sexuality
Objet petit a
Obscene phone call
Obscenity
Obsessive love
Obstetrics
Oculophilia
Odalisque
Odaxelagnia
Olfactophilia
Omorashi
On-again, off-again relationship
Oncofertility Consortium
One-child policy
One sex two sex theory
OneChild
OneTaste
Online dating service
Oocyte selection
Oogamy
Open relationship
Operation Spanner
Opportunistic breeders
Oragenitalism
Oral sex
Orbicule
Orgasm
Othermother
Otto Gross
Our Bodies, Ourselves
Our Whole Lives
Outline of human sexuality
Outline of relationships
Ovary
Oviduct
Oviparity
Ovipore
Oviposition
Ovipositor
Ovotestis

P
Paddle (spanking)
Pansexual
Pansexual Pride flag
Pansexuality
Paraphilia
Paraphilic infantilism
Partialism
Party and play
Paternal bond
Pearl Index
Pearl necklace (sexual act)
Pederasty
Pederasty in ancient Greece
Pedophilia
Peer Health Exchange
Pegging (sexual practice)
Pelvic congestion syndrome
Penile fracture
Penile plethysmograph
Penile implant
Penis
Penis captivus
Penis enlargement
Penis extension
Penis sleeve
People v. Jovanovic
Period of viability
Persistent genital arousal disorder
Personal lubricant
Perversion
Perversion for Profit
Petal
Peter Abelard
Petroleum jelly
Peyronie's disease
Phalloorchoalgolagnia
Phallus
Philosophy of love
Philosophy of sex
Phone sex
Physical attractiveness
Physical intimacy
Physiology
Pierre-François Hugues d'Hancarville
Pillow talk
Pinafore eroticism
Piquerism
Plant reproduction
Platonic love
Play piercing
Playboy (lifestyle)
Playing doctor
Plietesials
PLUR
Plushophilia
Polyamory
Polyamoury
Polyfidelity
Polymorphous perversity
Polysexuality
Pompoir
POPLINE
Population Council
Porcine zona pellucida
Porn groove
Porn Sunday
Pornographic film actor
Pornography
Pornography addiction
Pornography in Italy
Pornophobia
Pornosonic
Post-coital tristesse
Post-SSRI sexual dysfunction
Post Office (game)
Postorgasmic illness syndrome
Precocious puberty
Pregnancy
Pregnancy (mammals)
Pregnancy fetishism
Pregnancy over age 50
Premarital sex
Premature ejaculation
Premature ovarian failure
Premenstrual stress syndrome
Prenatal development
Prenatal hormones and sexual orientation
Priapism
Prick Up Your Ears (Family Guy)
Primal scene
Primary and secondary (relationship)
Prison rape
Prison sexuality
Privacy mode
Private Case
Promiscuity
Prostaglandin 2 alpha
Prostate
Prostate massage
Prostitution
Prostitution in Asia
Prudence and the Pill
Psychoanalysis
Psychology of sexual monogamy
Psychopathia Sexualis
Psychosexual disorder
Pubarche
Puberty
Public display of affection
Public indecency
Public sex
Puppy love
Purity test
Pussy
Putative father registry

Q
Queer
Queer heterosexuality
Queer pornography
Questioning (sexuality and gender)
Quickie
Quiverfull

R
R v Brown
R v Peacock
R. v. Hess; R. v. Nguyen
R. v. Stevens
Rainbow flag (LGBT movement)
Randa Mai
Rape
Rape by deception
Rating site
Red Triangle (family planning)
Reefer Madness (2003 book)
Reflectoporn
Refractory period (sex)
Regina Lynn
Relationship breakup
Religion
Religion and sexuality
Religious views on love
Religious views on pornography
Remarriage
Reproduction
Reproductive health
Reproductive Health Bill
Reproductive justice
Reproductive life plan
Reproductive medicine
Reproductive rights
Reproductive system
Reproductive system disease
Reproductive system of gastropods
Rimming
Robert Reid-Pharr
Robot fetishism
Roger T. Pipe
Roland Barthes
Roman Catholic sex abuse cases by country
Romance (love)
Romantic friendship
Romantic love
Rubber fetishism
Rusty trombone
Rutgers Nisso Group

S
Sadism and masochism in fiction
Sadomasochism
Safe sex
Salirophilia
Same-sex attraction
Same gender loving
San Francisco Armory
San Francisco Sex Information
Sanky-panky
Sarah Kofman
Saudade
Savage Grace
Savage Love
Schizoanalysis
Scientology and sexual orientation
Scopophilia
Scrotal inflation
Seasonal breeder
Secret admirer
Secret Museum, Naples
Section 63 of the Criminal Justice and Immigration Act 2008
Seduction
Seduction community
Seishitsu
Self-love
Semen extender
Sensual massage
Sensual play
Serial monogamy
Serial rape
Serosorting
Service-oriented (sexuality)
SESAMO
Settlements and bankruptcies in Catholic sex abuse cases
Seven minutes in heaven
Sex
Sex-positive feminism
Sex-positive movement
Sex Addicts Anonymous
Sex after pregnancy
Sex and drugs
Sex and Love Addicts Anonymous
Sex and sexuality in speculative fiction
Sex and the law
Sex assignment
Sex at Dawn
Sex club
Sex doll
Sex education
Sex education in the United States
Sex in advertising
Sex in space
Sex industry
Sex magic
Sex manual
Sex museum
Sex organ
Sex party
Sex positions
Sex scandal
Sex segregation
Sex shop
Sex steroid
Sex strike
Sex surrogate
Sex symbol
Sex therapy
Sex tourism
Sex toy
Sex toy party
Sex Week at Yale
Sex workers' rights
Sex, gender and the Roman Catholic Church
Sex: The Revolution
Sexaholics Anonymous
Sexercises
Sexism
Sexless marriage
Sexological testing
Sexology
Sexting
Sexual abstinence
Sexual abuse
Sexual activity during pregnancy
Sexual addiction
Sexual and Reproductive Health Matters
Sexual anorexia
Sexual arousal
Sexual arousal disorder
Sexual assault
Sexual Attitude Reassessment
Sexual attraction
Sexual bimaturism
Sexual capital
Sexual Compulsives Anonymous
Sexual dimorphism
Sexual dysfunction
Sexual ethics
Sexual fantasy
Sexual fetishism
Sexual field
Sexual frustration
Sexual function
Sexual harassment
Sexual health clinic
Sexual identity
Sexual Identity Therapy
Sexual inhibition
Sexual intercourse
Sexual intimacy
Sexual lubricant
Sexual meanings
Sexual medicine
Sexual minority
Sexual misconduct
Sexual morality
Sexual narcissism
Sexual network
Sexual norm
Sexual objectification
Sexual orientation
Sexual orientation and gender identity at the United Nations
Sexual orientation and military service
Sexual orientation and the Canadian military
Sexual orientation and the military of the Netherlands
Sexual orientation and the military of the United Kingdom
Sexual orientation and the United States military
Sexual orientation change efforts
Sexual orientation hypothesis
Sexual orientation identity
Sexual partner
Sexual penetration
Sexual Personae
Sexual repression
Sexual reproduction
Sexual revolution
Sexual ritual
Sexual roleplay
Sexual roleplaying
Sexual script
Sexual selection
Sexual selection in human evolution
Sexual slang
Sexual slur
Sexual stigma
Sexual stimulation
Sexual sublimation
Sexual violence
Sexual Violence: Opposing Viewpoints
Sexuality and disability
Sexuality and The Church of Jesus Christ of Latter-day Saints
Sexuality in ancient Rome
Sexuality in Ancient Rome
Sexuality in Christian demonology
Sexuality in Islam
Sexuality in Japan
Sexuality in music videos
Sexuality in older age
Sexuality in South Korea
Sexuality in Star Trek
Sexuality in China
Sexuality in the Philippines
Sexuality Information and Education Council of the United States
Sexuality of Abraham Lincoln
Sexuality of Adolf Hitler
Sexuality of David and Jonathan
Sexuality of Jesus
Sexuality of William Shakespeare
Sexualization
Sexually active life expectancy
Sexually suggestive
Sexually transmitted disease
Shalom bayit
Shelf (organization)
Shemale
Shettles Method
Shidduch
Shoe fetishism
Short-arm inspection
Sikhism and sexual orientation
Sima Qian
Simone de Beauvoir
Singles Awareness Day
Singles event
Sinthome
Sissy (crossdressing)
Situational sexual behavior
Skoptic syndrome
Sleep sex
Slut
Smirting
Smoking fetishism
Snowballing (sexual practice)
Social impact of thong underwear
Society for the Scientific Study of Sexuality
Sociobiological theories of rape
Sociosexual orientation
Sodomy
Sodomy law
Soggy biscuit
Somnophilia
Soulmate
Spandex fetishism
Spectatoring
Sperm
Sperm heteromorphism
Sperm motility
Sperm Wars
Spermalege
Spermarche
Spermatheca
Spermatid
Spermatogenesis
Spermatogenesis arrest
Spermatorrhea
Spermatozoon
Spermicide
Spin the bottle
Spinster
Spiritual marriage
Spirituality
Spooning (cuddling)
Sporogenesis
Stalag fiction
Stamen
Star-crossed
State v. Limon
Statutory rape
Stereotypes
Stigma (botany)
Stigma (1972 film)
Stillbirth
Stimulation of nipples
Strap-on dildo
Strip club
Strip poker
Stripper
Sub-replacement fertility
Sublimation (psychology)
Sumata
Survivors Healing Center
Survivors of Incest Anonymous
Suzanne Lilar
Swedish Association for Sexuality Education
Swing club
Swinging
Sybian
Syphilis

T
Tamakeri
Tanner scale
Tantric sex
Taoist sexual practices
Teabagging
Teenage pregnancy
Teenage pregnancy and sexual health in the United Kingdom
Teledildonics
Testicle
The ABC of Sex Education for Trainables
The Abortion Pill (film)
The birds and the bees
The Chapman Report
The Education of Shelby Knox
The Enchanter
The Encyclopœdia of Sexual Knowledge
The Erotic Review
The Ethical Slut
The Family Doctor
The Four Loves
The G Spot and Other Recent Discoveries About Human Sexuality
The History of Sexuality
The Imaginary (psychoanalysis)
The Little Red Schoolbook
The Man Who Would Be Queen
The Seminars of Jacques LacanThe Sexual Life of Savages in North-Western MelanesiaThe SymbolicThe Theory of FlightThe Trouble With Normal (book)
Thelarche
Theology
Therapeutic abortion
Thy Neighbor's Wife (book)
Tickling game
Timeline of sexual orientation and medicine
Title X
Tjurunga
Toothing
Top, bottom and versatile
Torture Garden (fetish club)
Total fertility rate
Total fertility rates by federal subjects of Russia
Tough love
Trans woman
Transactional sex
Transgender
Transgender Pride flag
Transgender sexuality
Transition nuclear protein
Transsexualism
Transvestic fetishism
Transvestism
Tribadism
Truth or Dare?
Tunica albuginea
Turkey slapTwenty Five Years of an ArtistTwo-spirit

U
UK Adult Film and Television Awards
Unconditional love
Unisex
Unitarian Universalism and sexual orientation
Unrequited love
Unsimulated sex in film
Upskirt
Urethral intercourse
Urethral sounding
Urogenital triangle
Urolagnia
Urology
Urophagia
Uterine serpin
Uterus

V
Vagina
Vaginismus
Valentine's Day
Vanilla sex
Venous leak
Venus 2000
Venus Butterfly
Vibrator (sensual)
Violet Blue (author)
Virginity
Virginity pledge
Virginity test
Virility
Virtual sex
Voltaire
Voluntary Parenthood League
Vorarephilia
Voulez-vous coucher avec moi?
Voyeurism
Vulnerability and Care Theory of Love
Vulva

W
Wakashū
Walk of shame
Wanker
War rape
Warming lubricant
Wax play
Wayne DuMond
Westermarck effect
Wet and messy fetishism
Wet Lubricants
WetlookWhere Do Teenagers Come From?Why Is Sex Fun?''
Wildlife contraceptive
Windmill Theatre
Womb veil
Women who have sex with women
World Association for Sexual Health
Wreath money

X
XBIZ
XBIZ Award
XRCO Award
XXXchurch.com

Y
Yoni
Youth Internet Safety Survey

Z
Zestra
 Zina
Zona pellucida
Zooerasty
Zoophilia
Zoosadism
Zoroastrianism and sexual orientation
Zygote
Zygote intrafallopian transfer

See also
Outline of human sexuality

Sexuality-related lists

Human sexuality topics